Landed may refer to:

 Landed (album), a 1975 album by Can
 "Landed", a song by Ben Folds from Songs for Silverman
 "Landed", a song by Drake from Dark Lane Demo Tapes
 Landed gentry, a largely historical privileged British social class
 Landed property, a real estate term

See also 
 Landing (disambiguation)
 Landed gentry (disambiguation)